Bolshoye Pozharovo is a rural locality (a village) in Yenangskoye Rural Settlement, Kichmengsko-Gorodetsky District, Vologda Oblast, Russia. The population was 9 as of 2002.

Geography 
Bolshoye Pozharovo is located 80 km southeast of Kichmengsky Gorodok (the district's administrative centre) by road. Maloye Pozharovo is the nearest rural locality.

References 

Rural localities in Kichmengsko-Gorodetsky District